Juan de Dios Vial del Río (born 1774–1850) was a Chilean politician who served as President of the Senate of Chile and President of the Chamber of Deputies.

References

External links
 BCN Profile

1774 births
1850 deaths
Chilean people
Chilean politicians
Presidents of the Senate of Chile
People from Concepción, Chile